Kate or Katie Walker may refer to:

 Kate Walker (writer), British romantic novelist
 Kate Walker (Syberia), the lead character of the Syberia video game franchise
 Katie Walker, British furniture designer
 Katie Walker (netball)

See also 
Katherine Walker (disambiguation)